Morten Thomsen (born 30 September 1957) is a Danish equestrian. He competed at the 1988 Summer Olympics and the 2000 Summer Olympics.

References

External links
 

1957 births
Living people
Danish male equestrians
Danish dressage riders
Olympic equestrians of Denmark
Equestrians at the 1988 Summer Olympics
Equestrians at the 2000 Summer Olympics
People from Sønderborg Municipality
Sportspeople from the Region of Southern Denmark